Classic! Live at Newport is a live album by American jazz saxophonist Joe Lovano recorded in 2005 during the 51st Newport Jazz Festival and released on  via Blue Note label. This is his 25th album to his Blue Note catalog.

Background
Lovano dedicated the album to the memory of both the pianist Hank Jones and longtime Blue Note president Bruce Lundvall. The six-tune recording features musical material drawn from the studio albums that Lovano recorded with Jones in 2004–2005. Lovano initially assembled his quartet with Jones, Mraz, and Motian in 2004 to record album I'm All For You. The record saw critical success, and the quartet returned to the studio to record the album Joyous Encounter, which was released in May 2005. That summer, Classic! Live at Newport was recorded with Lewis Nash who replaced Motian. On his website Lovano mentioned that this album is his final for Blue Note label.

Reception
Hrayr Attarian of Chicago Jazz Magazine noted "It took 11 years for saxophonist Joe Lovano’s superb live recording from the 51st Newport Jazz festival to be released. During these years, the world lost the ingenious pianist Hank Jones, who makes the resulting album Classic! Live at Newport all the more poignant. The disc is the fourth documented collaboration between Lovano and Jones and is as intriguing as the others, yet unique in its unbridled energy and lively spontaneity....This splendid disc not only captures an exciting and stimulating concert, it also renders it impeccably and with vivid sound. Listening to it is certainly not a substitute for the actual attendance of this memorable event, but Classic! does allow for repeated enjoyment of the work of a quartet captured at the height of its creative power."

John Paul of PopMatters wrote that "Classic! Live at Newport offers little in the way of new or unexpected turns from any of these performers. Instead it serves as a fine reminder of the strengths of each and a fitting showcase for the link between jazz’s old and new guard, Lovano falling squarely in the middle. Fans of straight-ahead jazz and thrilling live performances will find much to like here".

Track listing

Personnel
Band
Hank Jones – piano
Joe Lovano – tenor saxophone
George Mraz – bass
Lewis Nash – drums

Production
John Abbott – photography
Mike Joyce – design
Joe Lovano – producer
Kurt Lundvall – engineer, mastering, mixing
George Wein – producer
Judi Silvano – cover art

References

External links
 

2016 live albums
Blue Note Records live albums
Joe Lovano live albums